The Tahiti petrel (Pseudobulweria rostrata) is a species of seabird in the family Procellariidae. It is found in American Samoa, Australia, Fiji, French Polynesia, Mexico, New Caledonia, New Zealand, the Solomon Islands, Tonga, Vanuatu, and possibly the Cook Islands. It is a pelagic bird of the open seas, but nests in subtropical or tropical moist lowland forest, subtropical or tropical moist montane forest, subtropical or tropical moist shrubland and subtropical or tropical high-altitude shrubland. It has been recorded as a vagrant in Hawaii, Taiwan, Japan, Baja California, and, most surprisingly, in North Carolina 

While there has been limited research done on the Tahiti petrel and its interactions with other species, it has been found that there is a possibility for the Tahiti petrel to coexist with the wedge-tailed shearwater. Due to the petrel's foraging patterns, described as opportunistic, contrasting the shearwater's more aggressive scavenging patterns, there is limited competition for prey.

Subspecies
There are two listed subspecies of the Tahiti petrel:

P. r. rostrata, (Peale, 1848): breeds in the Marquesas and the Society Islands.
P. r. trouessarti, (Brasil, 1917): breeds in New Caledonia.

References 

Pseudobulweria
Birds described in 1848
Taxonomy articles created by Polbot
Taxa named by Titian Peale